Holden's Brewery is a family-run English regional brewery. It was founded in 1915 at the Park Inn in Woodsetton, Dudley, in the West Midlands.

History
Edwin Holden took over the Park Inn on George Street, Woodsetton, in 1915, and the pub is still owned by the Holden family. It was built in 1892.

In 2012 work began on a major expansion of the brewery to increase production capacity, with further plans to open up a visitor's centre in the near future.

The brewery, which supplies to several local pubs and sells its products in local shops, celebrated its 100th anniversary in 2015.

Availability
Holden's brewpub supplies cask ale to its twenty-two tied houses. Bottle conditioned ales are also available.

Beers
There are four regular beers; Black Country Bitter, Black Country Special Bitter, Black Country Mild, and Golden Glow, as well as a stout and winter warmer.

References

External links
Official Holden's Brewery website
Quaffale's brewery information
RateBeer's brewery information
BeerMad's brewery information

Breweries in England
British companies established in 1915
1915 establishments in England
Companies based in Staffordshire
Food and drink companies established in 1915